Hisayasu (written: 寿保 or 寿康) is a masculine Japanese given name. Notable people with the name include:

, Japanese politician
, Japanese film director

Japanese masculine given names